Meyers Chuck is a former census-designated place in the City and Borough of Wrangell, Alaska, United States. The population was 21 at the 2000 census, at which time it was in the former Prince of Wales-Outer Ketchikan Census Area. On June 1, 2008, it was annexed into the newly created City and Borough of Wrangell, most of whose territory came from the former Wrangell-Petersburg Census Area.

Geography
Meyers Chuck is located at  (55.742005, -132.263441). 
There are only two ways to get to Meyers Chuck, Alaska: by boat or float plane.

Demographics

Meyers Chuck first reported on the 1950 U.S. Census as the unincorporated village of "Meyer's Chuck." From 1950–70, it was returned as "Myers Chuck." In 1980 it returned as Meyers Chuck, when it was made a census-designated place (CDP). In 2008, it was formally annexed into Wrangell.

As of the census of 2000, there were 21 people, 9 households, and 7 families residing in the CDP. There were 48 housing units at an average density of 82.4/sq mi (32.0/km2). The racial makeup of the CDP was 90.48% White, and 9.52% from two or more races.

There were nine households, of which two had children under the age of 18 living with them, six were married couples living together, one had a female householder with no husband present, and two were non-families. No households were made up of individuals, and none had someone living alone who was 65 years of age or older. The average household size was 2.33 and the average family size was 2.29.

In the CDP, the age distribution of the population shows 9.5% under the age of 18, 23.8% from 25 to 44, 61.9% from 45 to 64, and 4.8% who were 65 years of age or older. The median age was 50 years. For every 100 females, there were 110.0 males. For every 100 females age 18 and over, there were 111.1 males.

The median income for a household in the CDP was $64,375, and the median income for a family was $64,375. The per capita income for the CDP was $31,660. There were no one living below the poverty line.

References

External links
   Blue Book of Boats: Cruising Destination - Meyers Chuck, Alaska

Former census-designated places in Alaska
Geography of Wrangell, Alaska